DiFelice is a surname. Notable people with the name include:

Mike DiFelice (born 1969), American baseball player
Mark DiFelice (born 1976), American baseball player and coach

See also
De Felice
Felice